Tipula scripta is a species of cranefly.

Distribution
Palaearctic.

Description
See

References

 

Tipulidae
Diptera of Europe
Insects described in 1830